Chae Shi-ra (born June 25, 1968) is a South Korean actress born in Seoul. Since 1990, Chae has firmly established her acting career with Eyes of Dawn in the 1990s, she was referred to as a representative actress of the period along with Kim Hee-ae and Ha Hee-ra.

Filmography
*Note; the whole list is referenced.

Film

Television series

Awards

References

External links 
 
 

20th-century South Korean actresses
South Korean film actresses
South Korean voice actresses
South Korean female models
1968 births
Living people
Dongguk University alumni
South Korean television actresses
21st-century South Korean actresses
Models from Seoul
Best Actress Paeksang Arts Award (television) winners